The Foreign Languages Publishing House (FLPH) is the central North Korean publishing bureau of foreign-language documents, located in the Potonggang-guyok of Pyongyang, North Korea. It employs a small group of foreigners to revise translations of North Korean texts so as to make those texts suitable for foreign-language publication.

The publishing house is under the control of the Propaganda and Agitation Department of the Workers' Party of Korea, which also makes decisions concerning its staff.

Foreign Languages Publishing House maintains the Naenara and Publications of the DPRK web portals, and publishes the periodicals , Korea Today, Foreign Trade of the DPRK, and the newspaper Pyongyang Times.

Foreign Languages Publishing House has a sports team in the Paektusan Prize civil servants games.

See also

 Foreign Languages Publishing House (Soviet Union), Moscow - similar publisher in Soviet Union
 Foreign Languages Press, Beijing – similar publisher in China
Foreign Languages Publishing House (Vietnam), Hanoi - similar publisher in Vietnam which is now known as Thế Giới Publishers
 Workers' Party of Korea Publishing House
 Progress Publishers – a Soviet printing house which published books and pamphlets in English on a wide range of topics

References

External links
 Publications for download at Publications of the DPRK
 Naenara 
 A Year in Pyongyang , An autobiography of a foreign reviser, Andrew Holloway is available online.
 Foreign Languages Publishing House – electronic documents published by the Foreign Languages Publishing House in Pyongyang.
 Korean Publication  – N. Korean official outlet
 North Korea Books  – Canadian firm selling North Korean literature

State publishers
Publishing companies of North Korea
Political book publishing companies
Mass media in Pyongyang
State media